Sidi Jaber is a town in Béni-Mellal Province, Béni Mellal-Khénifra, Morocco. According to the 2004 census it has a population of 4,693.

See also 
 Sidi Gaber

References

Populated places in Béni Mellal Province
Rural communes of Béni Mellal-Khénifra